Nikolaos Makarezos (1919 – 3 August 2009) was a Greek Army officer and one of the masterminds of the Greek military junta of 1967-1974.

Early life and career 
He was born in 1919 in the village of Gravia, in the prefecture of Phocis. After finishing the local school and the gymnasium at Lamia, he entered the Hellenic Military Academy in 1937, graduating in 1940 with the rank of 2nd Lieutenant of Artillery. His first posting was in the 1st Heavy Artillery Regiment. He took part in the Greco-Italian War and the Battle of Greece, following which he served in the armed forces of the Greek government in exile. Following the war, he completed his studies at the Greek Artillery School at Megalo Pefko, where he also served as an instructor in later years. He also completed a course at the US Army's Artillery School at Babenhausen in West Germany, and studied Economics and Political Science. In 1962-1965, he was placed as a military attaché at the Greek embassy in Bonn.

Junta 
Along with fellow Colonel Georgios Papadopoulos and Brigadier Stylianos Pattakos, he led the group of mid-ranking officers that overthrew the government of Panagiotis Kanellopoulos in a coup d'état on 21 April 1967 and established a military regime—the "Junta of the Colonels"—that lasted for seven years. Makarezos was a central figure in most of the ensuing dictatorial governments, as Coordination Minister until August 1971 and from then on until October 1973 as Deputy Prime Minister. Among the senior junta leadership, he alone had a knowledge of economics, so he was entrusted with the country's economy. The early years of the regime saw a notable economic boom, with increased development rates, low unemployment and low inflation. This was achieved through extensive foreign investments, the construction of infrastructure projects and considerable investments in the tourism industry. By 1973 however, the rate of development had begun falling, and the widespread corruption and financial scandals, as well as political stagnation, resulted in a drop in the regime's popularity. When Papadopoulos attempted to slowly democratize the regime in 1973, appointing the civilian Spyros Markezinis as Prime Minister, Makarezos was dropped from his government role.

Later life 
Following the collapse of the junta in July 1974, Makarezos was placed under arrest and sent to the island of Kea. Along with other junta leaders, he was then put on trial for treason and rebellion. Found guilty and sentenced to death, his sentence  was later commuted to life imprisonment.

Since 1990, Makarezos was released from jail on medical grounds on successive temporary leaves, but was confined to his house. He claimed to have regrets for many of his actions but continued to boast about his economic achievements during the junta. He died on August 3, 2009.

References

1919 births
2009 deaths
People from Phocis
Deputy Prime Ministers of Greece
Leaders of the Greek junta
Greek colonels
Hellenic Army officers
Greek anti-communists
Greek nationalists
Greek military personnel of World War II
People convicted of treason against Greece
Prisoners sentenced to death by Greece